Harper House is a historic home located near Harper, Johnston County, North Carolina.  It was built about 1850, and is a two-story, three-bay, vernacular Greek Revival style frame dwelling.  It sits on a brick pier foundation and has a hipped roof and interior end chimneys.  The front facade features a two-story pedimented portico. The house served as a Union field hospital during the Battle of Bentonville (March 19–21, 1865) and is located adjacent to the Bentonville Battlefield museum, which offers tours of its interior.
It was also bought by the state.  Before the state's acquisition of the property, it was privately owned by the Dunn family.  It served as a home for 5 children, John J. Dunn Jr. being the last child born in the Harper House in 1950.

It was listed on the National Register of Historic Places in 1970.  It is located in the Bentonville Battleground State Historic Site.

References

External links

American Civil War hospitals
Historic house museums in North Carolina
Houses on the National Register of Historic Places in North Carolina
Greek Revival houses in North Carolina
Houses completed in 1850
Museums in Johnston County, North Carolina
National Register of Historic Places in Johnston County, North Carolina
Historic district contributing properties in North Carolina